Anastasia Potapova was the defending champion, but chose to compete in the Ladies' Singles main draw as a qualifier, where she retired in the first round against Tatjana Maria.

Claire Liu won the title, defeating Ann Li in the final, 6–2, 5–7, 6–2.

Seeds

Draw

Finals

Top half

Section 1

Section 2

Bottom half

Section 3

Section 4

Qualifying

Seeds

Qualifiers

Draw

First qualifier

Second qualifier

Third qualifier

Fourth qualifier

Fifth qualifier

Sixth qualifier

Seventh qualifier

Eighth qualifier

References
 Draw

External links

Girls' Singles
Wimbledon Championship by year – Girls' singles